Truncal ataxia (or trunk ataxia) is a wide-based "drunken sailor" gait characterised by uncertain starts and stops, lateral deviations and unequal steps. It is an instability of the trunk and often seen during sitting. It is most visible when shifting position or walking heel-to-toe.

As a result of this gait impairment, falling is a concern in patients with ataxia.

Truncal ataxia affects the muscles closer to the body such as the trunk, shoulder girdle and hip girdle. It is involved in gait stability.

Truncal ataxia is different from appendicular ataxia. Appendicular ataxia affects the movements of the arms and legs. It is caused by lesions of the cerebellar hemispheres.

Causes

Truncal ataxia is caused by midline damage to the cerebellar vermis. There are at least 34 conditions that cause truncal ataxia.

Common
 Alcohol intoxication
 Cerebral infarction
 Cerebral hemorrhage
 Cerebellar ataxia
 Multiple sclerosis
 Friedreich's ataxia
 Drugs such as Benzodiazepines, Lithium, Phenytoin

Uncommon
 Adrenoleukodystrophy
 Ataxia oculomotor apraxia type 1
 Branchial myoclonus
 Christianson syndrome
 Dandy–Walker syndrome
 Dysequilibrium syndrome
 Epilepsy
 Episodic ataxia
 Post viral cerebellar ataxia
 Gerstmann–Sträussler–Scheinker syndrome
 Machado–Joseph disease
 Microcephaly
 N-acetylaspartate deficiency
 Neuhauser–Eichner–Opitz syndrome
 Paraneoplastic cerebellar degeneration
 Polymicrogyria
 Rett syndrome
 Spinocerebellar ataxia
 Vertebral dissection

References

External links
 NIH website

Alcohol and health
Symptoms and signs: Nervous system
Multiple sclerosis